The name Hal has been used for three tropical cyclones worldwide, one in the Southeastern Hemisphere and two in the Western Pacific Ocean.

In the Southern Hemisphere:
Cyclone Hal (1978) – traversed the Cape York Peninsula in Australia and later the North Island in New Zealand

In the Western Pacific:
Typhoon Hal (1985) – made landfall northeast of Hong Kong
Typhoon Hal (1988) – remained over the open ocean